HMS Stockham (K562) was a British Captain-class frigate of the Royal Navy in commission during World War II. Originally constructed as a United States Navy Buckley class destroyer escort, she served in the Royal Navy from 1943 to 1946.

Construction and transfer
The ship was laid down as the unnamed U.S. Navy destroyer escort DE-97 by Bethlehem-Hingham Shipyard, Inc., in Hingham, Massachusetts, on 25 August 1943 and launched on 31 October 1943. She was transferred to the United Kingdom upon completion on 28 December 1943.

Service history

Commissioned into service in the Royal Navy  as the frigate HMS Stockham (K562) on 28 December 1943 simultaneously with her transfer, the ship served on patrol and escort duty in the English Channel for the remainder of World War II. She also participated in the invasion of Normandy in 1944.

The Royal Navy returned Stockham to the U.S. Navy at the Philadelphia Naval Shipyard in Philadelphia, Pennsylvania, on 31 January 1946.

Disposal
The U.S. Navy received authorization on 21 February 1946 to dispose of Stockham and struck her from its Naval Vessel Register on 12 March 1946. She was sold to the Newport News Shipbuilding and Drydock Company of Newport News, Virginia, for scrapping, which was completed on 15 June 1948.

References
 (see DE-97 section at bottom of page)
Navsource Online: Destroyer Escort Photo Archive Stockham (DE-97) HMS Stockham (K-562)
uboat.net HMS Stockham (K 562)
Destroyer Escort Sailors Association DEs for UK

External links
Photo gallery of HMS Stockham (K562)

 

Captain-class frigates
Buckley-class destroyer escorts
World War II frigates of the United Kingdom
Ships built in Hingham, Massachusetts
1943 ships